Caloreas multimarginata is a moth in the family Choreutidae. It was described by Annette Frances Braun in 1925. It is found in North America, where it has been recorded from Utah and California.

References

Choreutidae
Moths described in 1925